Richard Lindley may refer to:

Richard Lindley (author) (born 1949), English author of philosophy & politics
Dick Lindley, English footballer
Richard Lindley (journalist) (1936–2019), English broadcast journalist

Richard lindley pubwatch for affray in Yarm